Tracy Smith is a CBS news correspondent for CBS News Sunday Morning and 48 Hours. Smith is a former Channel One News anchor and correspondent. She served as both co-anchor of the Saturday Early Show and a national correspondent for The Early Show from August 2005 through May 2007. Smith was succeeded by Maggie Rodriguez.

Early years
Smith was born in Wyoming, Ohio. She graduated cum laude with a Bachelor of Science degree from Boston University in 1990. She subsequently earned a master's degree in broadcast journalism from the University of Southern California in 1993.

In August 1993, Smith married CBS News Sunday Morning producer John D'Amelio, with whom she has two children. In April 2015, The Wilbur Award for the best "Television & Cable News: Network or national syndication" was awarded to Smith as correspondent; her husband, John D'Amelio, as producer; and Lauren Barnello, as producer/editor for the CBS Sunday Morning show "Heavenly Voices."

References 

Living people
People from Wyoming, Ohio
Boston University College of Communication alumni
USC Annenberg School for Communication and Journalism alumni
CBS News people
20th-century American journalists
American women journalists
Year of birth missing (living people)